Wołodko is a Polish-language surname. The surname is derived from the given name Wolodko, a diminutive from "Wołodimierz".

Russian  and Ukrainian languages equivalent: Volodko, Belarusian: Valadzko.

Notable people with this surname include:

Stanisław Wołodko (born 1950), Polish athlete
Weronika Wołodko (born 1998),  Polish women's volleyball player

 Polish-language surnames